Magnetic Heaven is the 1986 debut album by Wax.

The album cover, painted by Jason Bradley, shows the band members.

The European and the American editions of the album featured different versions of the song "Ball and Chain" with the latter edition having the longer one.

The album was reissued in Japan in 2011 with bonus tracks including "The Lie", B-side to "Ball and Chain" single, and singles' mixes of the songs "Ball and Chain" and "Hear No Evil".

Uses in media
In 1988, American pop singer Nicolette Larson covered the band's song "Shadows of Love", which served as the title of the album on which it appeared.

Track listing
All songs were written, arranged and performed by Andrew Gold and Graham Gouldman.

Side one
 "Right Between the Eyes" – 4:08
 "Hear No Evil" – 4:17
 "Shadows of Love" – 4:39
 "Marie Claire" – 4:09
 "Ball and Chain" – 4:28 / 5:49

Side two
 "Systematic" – 4:18
 "Breakout" – 4:19
 "Only a Visitor" – 5:00
 "Rise Up" – 5:29
 "Magnetic Heaven" – 3:36 (Instrumental)

Personnel
 Andrew Gold – vocals, backing vocals, keyboards, guitar, drums and programming, production on tracks 2, 4, and 8
 Graham Gouldman – bass guitar, backing vocals, guitar, vocals, production on tracks 2, 4, and 8
 Phil Thornalley – production and engineering on tracks 1, 3, 5–7, and 9-10
 Chris Dickie – assistant engineer
 Matt Barry – assistant engineer 
 Richard Scott – additional engineering at Strawberry Studios
 Chris Nagle - additional engineering at Strawberry Studios
 The Leisure Process – design and art direction
 Simon Frasier – photography

References

1986 debut albums
Wax (British band) albums
RCA Records albums
Albums produced by Andrew Gold
Albums produced by Graham Gouldman